Events of 2009 in Italy.

Incumbents
President: Giorgio Napolitano
Prime Minister: Silvio Berlusconi

Silvio Berlusconi controversies
Prime Minister Silvio Berlusconi is involved in several controversies in relation to his career and personal life.

Trial of Amanda Knox and Raffaele Sollecito
Knox and Sollecito were tried for and convicted of the Murder of Meredith Kercher.

L'Aquila earthquake
A major earthquake occurred in Abruzzo on 6 April, killing about 300 people.

Deaths
8 January – Flavio Orlandi, politician (born 1921)
11 January – Pio Laghi, Roman Catholic cardinal (born 1922)
9 February – Eluana Englaro, right-to-die patient (born 1970)
13 May – Achille Compagnoni, mountaineer (born 1914)
6 August – Riccardo Cassin, mountaineer (born 1909)
8 September – Mike Bongiorno, television personality (born 1924)
20 November – Lino Lacedelli, mountaineer (born 1925)

See also
 2009 in Italian television
 List of Italian films of 2009

 
Italy, 2009 In